Eun Yang (born June 13, 1976) is a Korean-American morning news anchor for WRC-TV, the local NBC-owned television station in Washington, D.C.

Prior to her position at News 4, she was one of the first reporters hired by the National Geographic Channel in Washington, D.C. Earlier she worked at WUSA, where she began as a reporter trainee and made her way up to substitute anchor.

Early life
Eun Yang was born in Seoul, South Korea and grew up in the Washington, D.C. area. She graduated from Paint Branch High School in Burtonsville, Maryland. She earned a degree in broadcast journalism from the University of Maryland at College Park. She now sits on the Board of Visitors for the Philip Merrill College of Journalism.

Professional career
Yang began her broadcast journalism career while at the University of Maryland.  She worked as a reporter for Maryland Update, a program on the University's cable channel. She then joined the National Geographic Channel as a correspondent for National Geographic Today.

After turning down a job in New York, the nation's number-one market, she joined NBC4 as a reporter.

While working for NBC4, she got the chance to broadcast Olympics 2018 in Seoul. She met two popes and was assigned to the Inaugurations of presidents. In 2019, she won the Emmy Award for being a great host of a restaurant show: the Foodies.

Personal life
Yang married Robert Kang. They live in the Washington metro area with their three children. From June 2008 to June 2009, Eun Yang created a Wordpress blog called "Eun Yang's Family Affairs" to share and keep specific memories on the internet.

References

External links
 Eun Yang bio at nbcwashington.com
 myfamilyaffairs.wordpress.com Eun Yang's Personal Blog
 NBC4 News Main page 

1976 births
Living people
American television reporters and correspondents
American writers of Korean descent
Journalists from Washington, D.C.
University of Maryland, College Park alumni
Television anchors from Washington, D.C.
South Korean emigrants to the United States
People from Seoul
People from Burtonsville, Maryland
American women television journalists